Shindo or Shindō may refer to:

Shindo (religion) (신도), an alternative name of Korean Shamanism used by Shamanic associations in modern South Korea.

People
Shindō (surname)
T.K. Shindo (1890-1974), Japanese photographer

Other uses
, a Japanese manga by Akira Sasō (1998), film and novel by Koji Hagiuda (2007)
"Shindo", a song by Less Than Jake on the 1996 album Losing Streak